The Tour D2 is a  tall skyscraper in the La Défense business district outside of Paris, France. It is located in the municipality of Courbevoie and is used for office purposes. It is the 13th tallest building in the Paris region. It includes a public garden on its roof.

See also
List of tallest buildings and structures in the Paris region

References

External links 

 Aerial Footage Office tower D2 in the business district of Paris La Défense (YouTube)

Buildings and structures in Hauts-de-Seine
Skyscraper office buildings in France
2014 establishments in France
Office buildings completed in 2014
La Défense
21st-century architecture in France